Jagodnja is a village in the municipality of Bratunac, Bosnia and Herzegovina.

286 inhabitants lived in Jagodnja in 1991, of which  284 (99,30% of the population) were Muslims. In 2013, it had a population of 60 inhabitants.

References

Villages in Republika Srpska
Populated places in Bratunac